The Kingdom of Lindsey or Linnuis was a lesser Anglo-Saxon kingdom, which was absorbed into Northumbria in the 7th century. The name Lindsey derives from the Old English toponym , meaning "Isle of Lind".  was the Roman name of the settlement which is now the City of Lincoln in Lincolnshire.

Geography
Lindsey lay between the Humber estuary and the Wash, forming its inland boundaries from the courses of the Witham and Trent rivers, and the Foss Dyke between them. A marshy region south of the Humber known as the Isle of Axholme was also included. It is believed that Roman Lindum (Lincoln) was the capital of Lindsey: the continuity of the place name suggests continuity of settlement traditions: in 625, Bede recounts, the missionary Paulinus of York was received by the praefectus of Lindum. Place-name evidence indicates that the Anglian settlement known as Lindisfaras spread from the Humber coast.

Lindsey means the 'island of Lincoln': it was surrounded by water and very wet land. Lincoln was in the south-west part of the kingdom. During the Anglo-Saxon settlement of Britain, from about 450, Lindsey was one of the lesser kingdoms. Although it has its own list of kings, at an early date it came under external influence. It was from time to time effectively part of Deira, of the Northumbrian kingdom and, particularly later, of Mercia. Lindsey lost its independence long before the arrival of the Danish settlers.

History
Toby Martin and Catherine Hills identify Lindsey as an area in which large-scale settlement by the Anglo-Saxons occurred. However, a continuing British presence in the region is indicated by the fact that major settlements such as Lincoln, and Lindsey itself, have partially Celtic names. Caitlin Green suggests that some communities may have continued to speak Brittonic until the eighth century.<ref>Caitlin Green, The Origins of Louth: Archaeology and History in East Lincolnshire, 400,000 BC-AD 1086 (2014), pp. 66-67</ref>

Lindsey's prominence was before the historical period. By the time of the first historical records of the kingdom, it had become a subjugated polity, under the alternating control of Northumbria and Mercia. Its subjugation may have occurred around AD 500. Its territories were absorbed into the historical English county of Lincolnshire, the northern part of which is called Lindsey. 

Kings of Lindsey
The Anglian collection of genealogies, which was created in the last years of the reign of Offa of Mercia, gives a pedigree for Aldfrið, presumed to have been ruler of Lindsey. It traces him to the Anglo-Saxon god, Woden, likewise made ancestor of the other Anglo-Saxon dynasties, and provides Woden's ancestry for several further generations.

Geot – Compare the Geats who are frequently mentioned in Beowulf's story.
Godulf
Finn
Frioðulf
Frealaf
Woden, the god. 
Winta – Compare Winteringham (the homestead of Winta's people) and Winterton, Lincolnshire (the farm/village of Winta's people).
Cretta
Cuelgils
Caedbaed
Bubba
Beda
Biscop
Eanferð
Eatta
Aldfrið

None of the individuals can be securely dated, though the name Biscop, Old English for 'bishop', suggests a time after conversion. Likewise, the practice of agnatic inheritance akin to blood tanistry in the Anglo-Saxon kingdoms means that it cannot be determined which of the listed male-line ancestors of Aldfrið actually ruled the kingdom.  Finally, it is uncertain at what point between Aldfrið and Woden the pedigree ceases to be historical, since this pedigree is the sole source for all of the individuals named, except perhaps Aldfrið.  With regard to Aldfrið, Frank Stenton referred to the witness list for an Anglo-Saxon charter which includes an "Ealfrid rex", and dated its writing to some time between the years 787 and 796. Scholars now believe that the name on the witness list should read "Ecgfrið Rex", and refers to Offa's son. He was anointed King of the Mercians in 787, nine years before his succession in 796, and would have been correctly styled rex''. Stenton suggested that the name 'Biscop' came from the title 'bishop' and must post-date Paulinus's mission to Lindsey of 628 CE. But, as Sarah Foot has pointed out, Biscop does not need to have been derived from an external origin. The other genealogies in the Anglian collection close with historic personages whose dates are known, such as Edwin of Deira (616–33), Ethelred of Mercia (675–704) and Ethelbert II of Kent (725–62), but this wide range offers little help in dating Aldfrið.

See also
Lindisfaras
Lindsey, Lincolnshire
Bishop of Lindsey

References

Bibliography

External links
 Lindisware (Lindissi / Lindsey) at History Files.

History of Lincolnshire
Lindsey
Petty kingdoms of England
States and territories established in the 5th century
Sub-kingdoms of Mercia
Parts of Lindsey
Former monarchies of Europe